Pauline Neff (1885-1951) was an American stage and screen actress.  

The daughter of judge Daniel J. Neff, she was born in Altoona, Pennsylvania and died in Los Angeles California. 

Neff married James P. Munyon, a "multi-millionaire medicine manufacturer" when she was 24 and he was "close to 60".

Her third husband was Frank T. Coffyn an aviator for the Wright Brothers, who often appeared in films alongside her.

Selected filmography
The Man from Mexico (1914)
Let Not Man Put Asunder (1924)
Her Husband's Secret (1925)
The Masked Bride (1925)
Ranson's Folly (1926)
Women Love Diamonds (1927)
The Claw (1927)

References

External links
 Pauline Neff at IMDb.com
 Pauline Neff at IBDb.com
Pauline Neff portrait (New York Public Library)
Portrait (University of Louisville)

1885 births
1951 deaths
Actresses from Pennsylvania
People from Altoona, Pennsylvania
American silent film actresses
20th-century American actresses
American stage actresses
American film actresses